Road Agent is a 1941 American western film directed by Charles Lamont starring Dick Foran, Andy Devine and Leo Carillo. It was the second in a series of Mexican road pictures. Filming started October 1941.

References

External links
Road Agent at IMDb
Road Agent at TCMDB

1941 films
American action films
1940s action films
Universal Pictures films
American black-and-white films
Films directed by Charles Lamont
1940s American films